James "Wootie" Wootton is a Canadian animator and character designer. His career began with the Cartoon Network animated television series Ed, Edd n Eddy, created by Danny Antonucci, which premiered on the network on January 4, 1999. Wootton served as a title sequence animator and a storyboard artist during the series' run, which garnered him an Annie Award nomination for the third season episode "Wish You Were Ed" on November 10, 2001. Wootton would later work on George of the Jungle, Kid vs. Kat, Roy, Martha Speaks, My Little Pony: Friendship Is Magic, Packages from Planet X, All Hail King Julien, and Kung Fu Panda: The Paws of Destiny.

Filmography

Accolades

References

External links
 

Living people
Canadian television directors
Canadian animators
Canadian storyboard artists
Year of birth missing (living people)